The men's singles luge competition at the 1976 Winter Olympics in Innsbruck was held from 4 to 7 February, at Olympic Sliding Centre Innsbruck.

Silver medalist Josef Fendt served as President of the International Luge Federation (FIL) from 1994 to 2020.

Results

References

Luge at the 1976 Winter Olympics
Luge